Yamama may refer to the following places:

Al-Yamama, a historical region in present-day central Saudi Arabia
Al Yamamah University, a university in Riyadh, Saudi Arabia
Al Yamamah (magazine), an Arabic weekly published in Saudi Arabia
Al-Yamamah arms deal, a series of arms deals between Saudi Arabia and the United Kingdom
Yamama, Morocco, a neighborhood in the city of Marrakesh